Antonín Brabec (2 April 1946, Dolní Kounice – September 2017, Bechyně) was a Czechoslovak slalom canoeist who competed from the late 1960s to the mid-1970s. He won four medals at the ICF Canoe Slalom World Championships with two silvers (C-2 team: 1973, 1975) and two bronzes (C-2: 1975, C-2 team: 1971).

Brabec also finished 10th in the C-2 event at the 1972 Summer Olympics in Munich.

References

External links

1946 births
2017 deaths
Canoeists at the 1972 Summer Olympics
Czechoslovak male canoeists
Olympic canoeists of Czechoslovakia
Medalists at the ICF Canoe Slalom World Championships
People from Dolní Kounice
Sportspeople from the South Moravian Region